Ming's Samba is an album by David Murray released on the Portrait label in 1988. It features five quartet performances by Murray with John Hicks, Ray Drummond and Ed Blackwell.

Reception
The Allmusic review by Scott Yanow awarded the album 4 stars stating "Although David Murray had already recorded a countless number of sessions as a leader by the late 1980s, Ming's Samba was his first on a large American label... A recommended release although this set will probably be difficult to find.".

Track listing
All compositions by David Murray except as indicated
 "Ming's Samba" – 10:54
 "Rememberin' Fats (for Fats Waller)" – 8:44 	
 "Nowhere Everafter" (Butch Morris) – 2:52
 "Spooning" (Morris) – 7:31
 "Walter's Waltz" – 9:24

Personnel
David Murray – tenor saxophone, bass clarinet
John Hicks – piano
Ray Drummond – bass
Ed Blackwell – drums

Reception 

1988 albums
David Murray (saxophonist) albums
Albums produced by Bob Thiele